Muraos are a community of agriculturists found in parts of Uttar Pradesh and Bihar. They are also known as Maurya. They form a part of a wider community called the Kushwaha, which includes Koeri and Kachhi castes. The All India Kushwaha Kshatriya Mahasabha is an organisation of these sub-castes, which also represents the interests of the Murao community.

In Uttar Pradesh, a section of the community called Kunjra amongst Muslims, classified as an Other Backward Class, was formed due to conversion of Muraos to Islam. The Kunjra are also called Sabj Farosh and like Muraos, they grew vegetables. In recent times, the community produced educated individuals engaged in white collar jobs.

References

Social groups of Bihar
Agricultural castes